Jyeṣṭhadeva (Malayalam: ജ്യേഷ്ഠദേവൻ) was an astronomer-mathematician of the Kerala school of astronomy and mathematics founded by Madhava of Sangamagrama. He is best known as the author of Yuktibhāṣā, a commentary in Malayalam of Tantrasamgraha by Nilakantha Somayaji (1444–1544). In Yuktibhāṣā, Jyeṣṭhadeva had given complete proofs and rationale of the statements in Tantrasamgraha. This was unusual for traditional Indian mathematicians of the time. The Yuktibhāṣā is now believed to contain the essential elements of the calculus and one of the earliest treatise on the subject.
 Jyeṣṭhadeva also authored  Drk-karana a treatise on astronomical observations.

According to K. V. Sarma, the name "Jyeṣṭhadeva" is most probably the Sanskritised form of his personal name in the local language Malayalam.

Life period of Jyeṣṭhadeva
There are a few references to Jyeṣṭhadeva scattered across several old manuscripts. From these manuscripts, one can deduce a few bare facts about the life of Jyeṣṭhadeva. He was a Nambudiri belonging to the Parangngottu family (Sanskrtised as Parakroda) born about the year 1500 CE. He was a pupil of Damodara and a younger contemporary of Nilakantha Somayaji. Achyuta Pisharati was a pupil of Jyeṣṭhadeva. In the concluding verse of his work titled Uparagakriyakrama, completed in 1592, Achyuta Pisharati has referred to Jyeṣṭhadeva as his aged benign teacher. From a few references in Drkkarana, a work believed to be of Jyeṣṭhadeva, one may conclude that Jyeṣṭhadeva lived up to about 1610 CE.

Parangngottu, the family house of Jyeṣṭhadeva, still exists in the vicinity of Trikkandiyur and Alathiyur. There are also several legends connected with members of Parangngottu family.

Mathematical lineage
Little is known about the mathematical traditions in Kerala prior to Madhava of Sangamagrama. 
Vatasseri Paramesvara was a direct disciple of Madhava. Damodara was a son of Paramesvara. Nilakantha Somayaji and Jyeshthadeva were pupils of Damodara. Jyeṣṭhadeva's pupil was Achyuta Pisharati and Melpathur Narayana Bhattathiri was Achyuta Pisharati's student.

Jyeshthadeva's works

Jyeṣṭhadeva is known to have composed only two works, namely, Yuktibhāṣā and Drkkarana. 
The former is commentary with rationales of Tantrasamgraha of Nilakantha Somayaji and the latter is a treatise on astronomical computations.

Three factors make Yuktibhāṣā unique in the history of the development of mathematical thinking in the Indian subcontinent:
 It is composed in the spoken language of the local people, namely, the Malayalam language. This is in contrast to the centuries-old Indian tradition of composing scholarly works in the Sanskrit language which was the language of the learned.
 The work is in prose, again in contrast to the prevailing style of writing even technical manuals in verse. All the other notable works of the Kerala school are in verse.
 Most importantly, Yuktibhāṣā was composed intentionally as a manual of proofs. The very purpose of writing the book was to record in full detail the rationales of the various results discovered by mathematicians-astronomers of the Kerala school, especially of Nilakantha Somayaji. This book is proof enough to establish that the concept of proof was not unknown to Indian mathematical traditions.

See also
 Kerala School
 Indian mathematics
 Indian mathematicians

References

Further references
 Details on the English translation of Yuktibhāṣā by K. V. Sarma:  (This is a critical translation of the original Malayalam text by K.V. Sarma with explanatory notes by K. Ramasubramanian, M.D. Srinivas and M.S. Sriram.)
 For a review of the English translation of Yuktibhāṣā:  
 
 
 
 
 
 For a modern explanation of Jyeṣṭhadeva's proof of the power series expansion of the arctangent function: 
 

Indian Hindus
16th-century Indian astronomers
1500 births
1575 deaths
Scientists from Kerala
People from Malappuram district
Malayali people
Kerala school of astronomy and mathematics
16th-century Indian mathematicians
Scholars from Kerala